Sthayi or Asthaayi is an initial phrase or line of a fixed, melodic composition in Hindustani music. It is a way of systematizing the parts of a composition. The Sthayi part of a Dhrupad is the first of four stanzas and uses the middle octave's first  tetrachord and the lower octave notes.

Sthayi means an octave. Shadjam to Nishadham is called sthayi or an octave. It is called a position. There are basically three sthayis but five sthayis are correct too.

See also

Antara (music)

References

Hindustani music terminology
Musical form